Philip Anthony Johnson (born November 16, 1940) is a retired American rower. He competed in coxless pairs at the 1964 and 1968 Olympics and won a silver medal in 1968.

Johnson was born in Washington, D.C., and began his rowing career under the legendary Charlie Butt at Washington-Lee High School.  He continued to row at Syracuse University and the Potomac Boat Club. At the 1964 Summer Olympics, he placed tenth together with James Edmonds. His breakthrough came in 1967, when, together with Larry Hough, he won the Pan American Games, the National Championship, the North American Championship, and the European Championship. Next year they placed second at the 1968 Olympics, and in 1969 won another European title.

Johnson graduated from Syracuse University, and in 1972 served as an assistant U.S. Olympic rowing coach; he later prepared the national team to the 1975 and 1985 world championships. From 1989 to 2014 he directed the rowing program at Georgetown University. After the 2013-2014 season Johnson was appointed Coach Emeritus. He first coached the Georgetown crew from 1967 to 1969 before moving to Yale University for 20 years. In developing the sport of rowing at Georgetown, Johnson oversaw significant growth of the program starting as the only full-time coach in 1989 to overseeing a team of eight coaching staff with four varsity and four novice teams. Georgetown competes both as a member of the Eastern Association of Rowing Colleges and in the Eastern Association of Women's Rowing Colleges.

Returned to Georgetown in 2022 to coach the Men's Heavyweight team.

References

1940 births
Living people
Sportspeople from Washington, D.C.
Rowers at the 1964 Summer Olympics
Rowers at the 1968 Summer Olympics
Olympic silver medalists for the United States in rowing
American male rowers
Medalists at the 1968 Summer Olympics
Pan American Games medalists in rowing
Pan American Games gold medalists for the United States
Rowers at the 1967 Pan American Games
European Rowing Championships medalists
Medalists at the 1967 Pan American Games
Washington-Liberty High School alumni
Georgetown Hoyas rowing coaches